This list of Tangutologists includes those scholars who have made notable contributions to Tangutology (the study of Tangut people, their culture, religion, history, language and writing system).

See also
 List of Khitanologists
 List of sinologists
 List of Tangut books

References

External links 

 Bibliography of Tangut Studies

Tangutologists